Tokyo Destiny (東京デスティニー) is the thirty-ninth single by the Japanese Pop rock band Porno Graffitti. It was released on October 16, 2013.

Track listing

References

2013 singles
Porno Graffitti songs
SME Records singles
Song articles with missing songwriters